Yosef "Jo" Amar (1 June 1930 – 26 June 2009) was a noted Moroccan-Israeli singer and hazzan.

Biography
Joseph (Jo) Amar was born in Settat, and began his singing career in the late 1940s in Morocco. In 1956, Amar emigrated from Morocco to Israel where he lived on Moshav Yad Rambam.

Jo Amar performed with Lilith Nagar in the 1960 Israel Song Festival, winning third place with the song "Leil HaChag." The first verse of the song was sung in Arabic.

He was a pioneer in the introduction of Moroccan Jewish liturgical music to Israel. He became associated with mizrahi music, mixing the melodies of traditional Sephardic Jewish music with Arabic music and Western music.

Amar tried to introduce Mizrahi music originating in Middle Eastern or North African countries to mainstream Israeli culture.  He then moved to New York City in 1970, where he performed music and became noted for his work as a Jewish cantor. Within twenty years, he moved back to Israel.

He published an anthology of liturgical music from Morocco and recorded more than 20 albums, including two with the Israeli Andalusian Orchestra (התזמורת האנדלוסית הישראלית). His hits include "Yismah Moshe", "Shalom LeVen Dodi", "Barcelona", "Song of the Drunkard", "Ani Havatzelet HaSharon", and many more.

In 2008, a musical evening of tribute was held in his honor in Jerusalem. Mayor Uri Lupoliansky presented Amar with a certificate of appreciation, and selections from a movie on his life, beginning with his childhood in Morocco, were screened.

Death
Jo Amar died at age of 79, at the home of his son in Woodmere, New York. He had been suffering from Parkinson's disease.  He was buried at Moshav Yad Rambam, in central Israel.

See also
Music of Israel

References

Sources
 Menashe Ravina, Shlomo Skolsky (Ed.): Who is who in ACUM. Authors, Composers and Music Publishers, biographical notes and principal works. Acum Ltd., Societe d'Auteurs, Compositeurs et Editeurs de Musique en Israel, 1965.

External links
Obituary for Jo Amar, The New York Times; accessed 25 February 2016. 
Notice of Jo Amar's death, The Jerusalem Post, jpost.com; accessed 25 February 2016.
 

1930 births
2009 deaths
Israeli hazzans
20th-century Israeli male singers
Moroccan emigrants to Israel
20th-century Moroccan male singers
20th-century Moroccan Jews
People from Settat
Deaths from Parkinson's disease
Neurological disease deaths in New York (state)